Athena is the name of several characters in the fictional Battlestar Galactica universe.

Lieutenant Athena, a bridge officer in the 1978–79 television series Battlestar Galactica
Number Eight (Battlestar Galactica), a Humanoid Cylon, with multiple copies, in the 2004 reboot of Battlestar Galactica, one of whom is Sharon "Athena" Agathon.

See also
Athena (disambiguation)

Battlestar Galactica characters